Urdaneta is a name of Basque origin; it may refer to:

People
 Abelardo Rodríguez Urdaneta (1870–1933), Dominican sculptor
 Andrés de Urdaneta (1498–1568), Basque Spanish explorer
 Ángel Alfonso Bravo Urdaneta (born 1942), Venezuelan baseball player
 Betty Urdaneta, Venezuelan First Lady, 1979–1984
 Gabriel Urdaneta (born 1976), Venezuelan football player
 Isabel Sánchez de Urdaneta, Venezuelan stateswoman and feminist
 Lino Urdaneta (born 1979), Venezuelan baseball player
 Luciano Urdaneta Vargas, Venezuelan architect who designed the Palacio Federal Legislativo
 Orlando Urdaneta (born 1950), Venezuelan actor
 Óscar Sambrano Urdaneta (1929–2011), Venezuelan writer and literary critic
 Rafael Urdaneta (1788–1845), Venezuelan general
 Roberto Urdaneta Arbeláez (1890–1972), Colombian president, 1951–1953
 Vivian Urdaneta (born 1979), Venezuelan journalist and beauty queen
 Yolmer Urdaneta, Venezuelan Paralympic discus thrower

Places

Ecuador
 Urdaneta Canton, a canton in the province of Los Ríos
 Urdaneta, an urban parish in Guayaquil Canton, Guayas Province

Mexico
 Urdaneta, a station on Line 1 of the Guadalajara light rail system

Philippines
 Urdaneta, Pangasinan, a city in the province of Pangasinan
 Barangay Urdaneta, a section of Makati Central Business District in Metro Manila

Spain
 Barrio de Urdaneta, town in the  Municipality of Aia, province of Gipuzkoa

Venezuela
 Urdaneta Municipality, Aragua, a municipality in Aragua State
 Urdaneta Municipality, Lara, a municipality in Lara State
 Urdaneta Municipality, Miranda, a municipality in Miranda State
 Urdaneta Municipality, Trujillo, a municipality in Trujillo State
 La Cañada de Urdaneta,  a municipality in Zulia

Other
 , a US Navy gunboat